El Panameño was a liberal weekly newspaper published from Panamá, Colombia 1849–1857. The first issue was published on January 1, 1849. Mariano Arosemena was the director of El Panameño. José Angel Santos was the editor of the newspaper. Dr. Mateo Iturralde, Santiago de la Guardia and Pablo Arosemena were prominent personalities in the team behind the newspaper.

Seeking to compete with The Panama Star the printers of El Panameño launched a short-lived English-language publication, Panama Sun.

References

Publications established in 1849
Publications disestablished in 1857
Newspapers published in Colombia
Spanish-language newspapers
Newspapers published in Panama
1849 establishments in the Republic of New Granada